The English rock band Supertramp recorded over 100 songs from 1970 to 2002. They were one of the most popular British bands in the 70s and 80s, known for their success with progressive rock.

Songs

Notes

References

 
Supertramp
Supertramp